Stoenești is a commune in Olt County, Oltenia, Romania. It is composed of a single village, Stoenești.

The February 1999 Mineriad ended in this village. Unofficial figures indicated that 15 miners died during clashes with law enforcement.

References

Communes in Olt County
Localities in Oltenia